The 1939 Tour de France was the 33rd edition of the Tour de France, taking place from 10 to 30 July.

Taking place on the eve of World War II, there was already much animosity in Europe. Italy, Germany and Spain all declined to send teams to the race, so the 1938 Italian champion Gino Bartali would not be defending his title. To fill out the ranks, Belgium sent two teams, and France had five teams. This would be the final Tour for eight years, until 1947.

Between the second and the seventh stage, the last rider in the general classification was eliminated.

The race was won by Belgian Sylvère Maes who also won the mountains classification.

Innovations and changes
For the first time, a mountain time trial was scheduled: stage 16b.
A rule was added to make it more difficult to finish the race: from the second stage to the seventh stage, the last rider in the classification was to be removed from the race.

The nutrition of the cyclists became more professional: cyclists were reporting that the use of vitamins increased their performance.

Teams

Because Italy, Germany and Spain did not send teams, the Tour organisation were short on participating cyclists. To solve this, they allowed Belgium to send two teams, and France to send four additional regional teams.

The French cyclists had been successful in the 1930s, but their Tour winners were absent in 1939: 1930 and 1932 winner André Leducq had retired in 1938, as had 1931 and 1934 winner Antonin Magne; 1933 winner Georges Speicher did not ride, and 1937 winner Roger Lapébie was injured. This all made the Belgian team favourite.

The teams entering the race were:

 Belgium
 Switzerland
 Luxembourg
 Netherlands
 France
 Belgium B
 France North-East/Île de France
 France West
 France South-West
 France South-East

Route and stages

Race overview

In the first stage, regional Amedée Fournier won the sprint of a group of nine cyclists, and was the first cyclist in 1939 to wear the yellow jersey. In the next stage, Romain Maes, who had finished in the same group as Fournier, won the time trial, and captured the lead. He lost it in the second part of that stage, when a group got away. Three regional riders were now on top of the general classification, led by Jean Fontenay.

René Vietto, leader of the regional South-East team, was in second place. In the fourth stage, Vietto got into the winning break, and took over the lead, closesly followed by Mathias Clemens on six seconds.

In the ninth stage, the single Pyrenees stage of 1939, Edward Vissers attacked instead of helping his team leader Sylvère Maes. Vissers won the stage, but Vietto was able to stay with Maes. Maes climbed to the second place in the general classification, three minutes behind Vietto.

Maes was able to win back a little time, and just before the Alps were climbed from stage 15 on, Vietto was still leading, with Maes still in second place, two minutes behind. Sylvère Maes attacked on that stage, and Vietto was not able to follow. Vietto finished 17 minutes behind Maes, and lost the lead. The next stage was split in three split stages. In the first part, Vietto was able to stay close to Maes, but in the second part, the individual mountain time trial, Maes won ten minutes on Vietto. Maes was now leading with a margin of 27 minutes, and the victory seemed secure.

In the last stages, Maes was able to extend his lead with a few more minutes. Maes became the winner, with a margin of more than half an hour.

Classification leadership and minor prizes

The time that each cyclist required to finish each stage was recorded, and these times were added together for the general classification. If a cyclist had received a time bonus, it was subtracted from this total; all time penalties were added to this total. The cyclist with the least accumulated time was the race leader, identified by the yellow jersey. Of the 79 cyclists that started the race, 49 finished.

For the mountains classification, 10 mountains were selected by the Tour organisation. The mountains classification in 1939 was won by Sylvère Maes. The first cyclist to reach the top received 10 points, the second cyclist 9 points, and so on until the tenth cyclist who received 1 point.

The team classification was calculated in 1939 by adding up the times of the best three cyclists of a team; the team with the least time was the winner. In 1939, there were ten teams of eight cyclists. There were the national teams of Belgium, Switzerland, Luxembourg, Netherlands, and France. Belgium also sent a second team, "Belgium B". Finally, there were four regional French teams: North-East, West, South-West and South-East. The South-West team was registered with eight cyclist, but only seven cyclists started the race. Only two of the South-West cyclists finished the race, so they were not in the team classification.

Final standings

General classification

Mountains classification

Team classification

Aftermath
Although he did not win the race, René Vietto became a popular cyclist. He was the most popular runner-up in France until Raymond Poulidor.

The sales of the organising newspaper l'Auto had dropped to 164000, and the newspaper was sold to Raymond Patenôtre. A few months after Germany had conquered France in the Second World War, Patenôtre sold l'Auto to the Germans.

Directly after the Tour, the organisation announced the 1940 Tour de France would be run in 20 stages and five rest days. But the Second World War made it impossible to hold a Tour de France in the next years, although some replacing races were held. Only in 1947 would the Tour be held again, and Vietto would again play an important role then, holding the yellow jersey as leader of the general classification for 15 of the 21 stages.

The victory of Maes would be the last Belgian Tour victory for 30 years, until Eddy Merckx won the 1969 Tour de France.

Notes

References

Bibliography

External links

 
Tour de France
Tour de France by year
Tour de France